In mathematics, the Artin–Mazur zeta function, named after Michael Artin and Barry Mazur, is a function that is used for studying the iterated functions that occur in dynamical systems and fractals.

It is defined from a given function  as the formal power series

Note that the zeta function is defined only if the set of fixed points is finite for each . This definition is formal in that the series does not always have a positive radius of convergence.

The Artin–Mazur zeta function is invariant under topological conjugation.

Analogues

The Artin–Mazur zeta function is formally similar to the local zeta function, when a diffeomorphism on a compact manifold replaces the Frobenius mapping for an algebraic variety over a finite field.

The Ihara zeta function of a graph can be interpreted as an example of the Artin–Mazur zeta function.

See also

Lefschetz number
Lefschetz zeta-function

References 
 
 
 
 

Zeta and L-functions
Dynamical systems
Fixed points (mathematics)